Jesus, stylized as j e s u s  is the second mixtape by American rapper Blu. It was released on August 30, 2011 under Blu's own label New World Color. The album is notable for being the only project featuring beats from  producers The Alchemist, Madlib, and Knxwledge all on one project.

Track listing

References

External links

Blu (rapper) albums
2011 albums
Albums produced by the Alchemist (musician)
Albums produced by Madlib
Albums produced by Knxwledge